Terumi Asoshina (阿蘇品照美; born 2 August 1982) is a Japanese long-distance runner who specializes in the half marathon.

She finished twelfth at the 2005 World Half Marathon Championships, which was good enough to help Japan finish third in the team competition.

Personal bests
5000 metres - 15:22.51 min (2003)
10,000 metres - 31:23.55 min (2005)
Half marathon - 1:09:54 hrs (2005)

References

1982 births
Living people
Japanese female long-distance runners
20th-century Japanese women
21st-century Japanese women